The +D (or Plus D) was a floppy disk and printer interface for the ZX Spectrum home computer, developed as a successor to Miles Gordon Technology's earlier product, the DISCiPLE. It was designed to be smaller, cheaper, simpler and thus more reliable.

It discarded a number of the less important features of the earlier product — the network and joystick ports, the inhibit button and the pass-through connector — and replaced its ancestor's plastic wedge-shaped design which fit under the Spectrum with a simple flat metal slab which protruded from the rear of the computer.

It provided only floppy disk and Centronics parallel interfaces, plus a non-maskable interrupt button. The +D's casing was simple folded steel, which was not only stronger than before but acted as a heatsink, improving reliability. Apart from the missing ports, though, it was software-compatible with the larger device.

The +D's DOS was named G+DOS, and was compatible with the DISCiPLE's DOS, GDOS. SAM DOS for MGT's SAM Coupé was backwards-compatible with GDOS and G+DOS. "The Complete +D Disassembly" by Rudy Biesma documents the "G+DOS system 2a" version.  An enhanced version called Beta DOS fixed bugs and added features.

In later years a complete new system called UNI-DOS was developed by SD Software for the DISCiPLE and +D interfaces.

The popularity of the DISCiPLE led to the formation of a user group and magazine, INDUG, which later became Format Publications. Usergroups like INDUG/Format in the UK or DISCiPLE-Nieuwsbrief in the Netherlands produced enhancements such as extended printer support.

The +D design was later licensed by Datel and it continued on sale for some years after MGT's demise.  Its design and chips have been released into the public domain and it still remains available commercially or even as a DIY project.

References

External links
 How to build a +D for yourself 
 rwapsoftware.co.uk still offer the +D Disk Interface for sale

ZX Spectrum